The Husky Lloydminster Refinery is an asphalt refinery located in the city of Lloydminster, Alberta, Canada owned by Husky Energy.  The refinery provides oil products, primarily 30 different grades of asphalt (2120 m³/day ), as well as light distillate, kerosene distillate, atmospheric gas oil, light vacuum gas oil (VGO), and heavy vacuum gas oil. This refinery is Canada's largest asphalt supplier, processing 27,000 barrels of heavy crude oil per day to produce asphalt. Husky is the "largest marketer of paving asphalt in Western Canada with a 29 mbbls/day capacity asphalt refinery located at Lloydminster, Alberta "integrated with the local heavy oil production, transportation and upgrading infrastructure." 

The Refinery generates its own steam.

The Refinery is often confused with the Lloydminster Heavy Oil Upgrader which is also owned by Husky Energy and is located just east of the city along with Meridian Cogen and an Ethanol Plant

The asphalt is mined in Geological formation sub-unit Lloydminster Sand of the Mannville Group, a Stratigraphic range in the Western Canadian Sedimentary Basin.

See also
 Husky Lloydminster Refinery, Lloydminster (Husky Energy), 
 Scotford Upgrader, Strathcona County (Shell Oil Company), 
 Strathcona Refinery, Strathcona County (Imperial Oil), 
 Sturgeon Refinery, Sturgeon County (North West Redwater Partnership — Canadian Natural Resources and North West Refineries),    
 Suncor Edmonton Refinery, Strathcona County (Suncor Energy),

External links
 Husky Energy - The Company

References

Oil refineries in Canada
Buildings and structures in Lloydminster
Husky Energy subsidiaries
1947 establishments in Alberta